Jubilee Gardens may refer to:
 Jubilee Gardens, Barnes
 Jubilee Gardens, Ely
 Jubilee Gardens, Lambeth
 Jubilee Gardens, Twickenham, a playground
 Jubilee Garden (Hong Kong), a housing estate
 Jubilee Garden, a park in Rajkot, India